Friling is a surname. Notable people with the surname include:

Albert Friling (1879–?), Belgian footballer
Tuvia Friling (born 1953), Israeli historian and professor